Anathi Bhongo Mnyango (born 8 January 1993), known professionally as Anatii, is a South African rapper, singer, songwriter and record producer & music video director.

Career

Anatii began his professional musical journey at the age of 14 when he received his first major South African placement with L-Tido, for the song "When It Rains".

His debut studio album Artiifact was released on 9 September 2016. The album features South African acts AKA, Cassper Nyovest, Nasty C and Uhuru, as well as Nigerian singer Tiwa Savage, Somali-Canadian electronic duo Faarrow and American singer Omarion.

In August 2017, Anatii was selected as The Young Independents influencer of the year

October 2017 saw Anatii being selected by GQ South Africa as one of the best dressed men in South Africa

In November 2017, Anatii, was selected to be a high level influencer for the LuQuLuQu project set up by the United Nations High Commission for Refugees. The official launch in South Africa for the project took place on 29 November 2017 at the Four Seasons Westcliff hotel in Johannesburg.

2018 has seen Anatii, listed in the Forbes Africa's 30 under 30 creatives list.

Discography

Studio albums

Singles

Production credits 

2008
 Morale – Ain't No Thing 
 L-Tido – When it Rains feat. Anathi Royal

2009
 Lebo M – Baby I Refuse 
 Lebo M – Mind Reader 
 Lebo M – Sounds Like Thunder

2012
 Anatii – Thunder Thighs

2013
 Chad da Don – Hola feat. Cassper Nyovest

2014
 Anatii – Bananaz feat. DJ Khaled 
 Anatii – Freedom 
 Cassper Nyovest – Bad One feat. Anatii 
 DJ Dimplez – Yaya feat. Dreamteam & Anatii 
 DJ Dimplez – Criminal feat. Tumi Molekane, Buffalo Souldier, Reason & Anatii 
 DJ Dimplez – Her feat. Cassper Nyovest, Anatii & Maggz
 DJ Dimplez – We Ain't Leaving feat. L-Tido & Anatii 
 DJ Dimplez – Way Up feat. JR & Cassper Nyovest 
 DJ Milkshake – My Own feat. Cassper Nyovest & Anatii 
 Fistaz Mixwell – Alone feat. Riky Rick, Anatii & Chad da Don 
 Fistaz Mixwell – No Filter feat. Anatii, Big Nuz, Moneoa, MKW & Thebe 
 HHP – Toto and Gogo (Don't Forget) feat. Anatii

2015
 DJ Speedsta – Special Somebody feat. Cassper Nyovest, Riky Rick & Anatii 
 Cassper Nyovest – Doc Shebeleza Remix feat. Talib Kweli 
 Anatii – The Saga feat. AKA 
 Cassper Nyovest – Ghetto feat. DJ Drama & Anatii
 Cassper Nyovest – 428 to LA feat. Casey Veggies 
 Cassper Nyovest – Single for the Night feat. Wizkid 
 Anatii – Feeling on Me 
 Dreamteam – Shandis feat. Anatii 
 Cassper Nyovest – Tse Tswembu Tse Blind feat. DJ Drama 
 Riky Rick – Fuseg feat. Cassper Nyovest & Anatii 
 Danny K – For The Girls feat. Anatii (2015)
 Chad – Sorry Mom I'm Moving Out feat. Anatii

2016
 Anatii & Cassper Nyovest – Jump feat. Nasty C 
 Jay Spitter – Amalobolo feat. Anatii

2017
 AKA & Anatii – 10 Fingers 
 Portia Monique & Anatii – Everywhere You Go 
 AKA & Anatii – Don't Forget To Pray 
 Cassper Nyovest – Destiny feat. Goapele 
 Ma nala – Soze 
 Omarion – Open Up

2018
 Anatii – Thixo Onofefe 
 Seyi Shay – The Vibe feat. Anatii, DJ Tira, Slimcase & Danger 
AKA – Me & You 
AKA – Daddy Issues II 
DJ Dimplez – Vacation feat. Anatii & Da L.E.S

Songwriter credits 
2019
 MOOD 4 EVA – Beyoncé, Jay-Z & Childish Gambino
Brown Skin Girl feat. Blue Ivy Carter – Beyoncé, SAINt JHN & Wizkid

Awards and nominations

References

1993 births
Living people
South African record producers
South African musicians
People from the Eastern Cape
Xhosa people